Rosevale is a rural locality in the Scenic Rim Region, Queensland, Australia.

Geography 

The Bremer River enters the locality from the south-west (Moorang) and exits to the north (Mount Walker West / Mount Walker).

History 

The name Rosevale is a corruption of Rossvale, the name of a pastoral run pastoral used first in 1850s by William Ross.

The Rosevale Retreat Hotel was built in 1852 as a homestead and is the state's oldest hotel building. A victualler's licence was granted in 1887 to a Matthew Carmody.

Rosevale State School opened 24 November 1884. It was mothballed on 31 December 2009 and closed on 31 December 2010. The school was located at 628 Sellars Road  (corner of Tierneys Bridge Road). The school's website was archived.

St Stephen's Anglican Church was opened circa 1887. The church closed circa 1962.

Rosevale has previously belonged to the Shire of Mutdapilly, Shire of Moreton and the Shire of Boonah local government areas.

The Lutheran church burned down in 1928. In 1929 the Congregational Church in Peak Crossing was to be replaced so the former church building was purchased and relocated to Rosevale to become the new Lutheran church.

For a detailed history of the district see St Patrick's Church, Rosevale#History.

Heritage listings 

Rosevale has a number of heritage-listed sites, including:
 St Patrick's Catholic Church and Graveyard, Rosewood – Aratula Road
 St Paul's Lutheran Church, 572 Rosevale Road
 Rosevale Retreat Hotel, 903 Rosevale Road

Education 
There are no schools in Rosevale. The nearest government primary schools are Warrill View State School in neighbouring Warrill View to the east and Aratula State School in Aratula to the south. The nearest government secondary schools are Rosewood State High School in Rosewood to the north and Boonah State High School in Boonah to the south-east.

References

Further reading

External links 

 

Towns in Queensland
Scenic Rim Region
Localities in Queensland